The R-17 Elbrus, GRAU index 9K72 is a tactical ballistic missile, initially developed by the Soviet Union. It is also known by its NATO reporting name SS-1C Scud-B. It is one of several Soviet missiles to carry the reporting name Scud; the most prolifically launched of the series, with a production run estimated at 7,000 (1960–1987). Also designated R-300 during the 1970s, the R-17 was derived from the R-11 Zemlya. It has been operated by 32 countries and manufactured in four countries outside the Soviet Union. It is still in service with some. It's been called the Hwasong-5 in North Korea.

History
The first mock-up was designed and built by Makeyev in 1958–1959, before the programme was transferred to the Votkinsk Machine Building Plant in 1959 for mass production. The first launch was conducted in 1961, and it entered service in 1964.

Design
The R-17 featured important improvements over the R-11. The Isayev RD-21 engine used a combination of inhibited red fuming nitric acid (IRFNA) oxidiser and unsymmetrical dimethylhydrazine (UDMH) fuel, fed into the combustion chamber by fuel pumps that ensured a more consistent thrust. The guidance system, active only during the boosted phase, uses three gyroscopes, that give it a Circular error probable (CEP) of 450 m (900 m according to western sources.) A nuclear warhead was designed for the R-17, with a selectable yield, from 5 to 70 kilotons. However it could also carry a chemical warhead, containing 555 kg of viscous VX; a conventional weapon, with a single high explosive warhead; or a series of fragmentation payloads, using either high explosive, anti-tank or anti-runway munitions.

At first, the R-17 was carried on a tracked TEL similar to that of the R-11, designated 2P19, but this was not very successful, as the vibration of the tracks had a tendency to interfere with the launch electronics. Production of this model was halted after Khrushchev cancelled the production of heavy tanks in 1962, and a wheeled launcher was designed by the Titan Central Design Bureau, becoming operational in 1967. The new MAZ-543 vehicle was officially designated 9P117 Uragan, and its Russian crews nicknamed it Kashalot (sperm whale), because of its size. The eight-wheeled MAZ-543 has a loaded weight of 37,400 kg, a road speed of 55 km/h and a range of 650 km. It can carry out the launch sequence autonomously, but this is usually directed from a separate command vehicle. The missile is raised to a vertical position by means of hydraulically powered cranes, which usually takes four minutes, while the total sequence lasts about one hour.

Constitution

The units of the R-17 theater ballistic missile were organized with the following vehicles:

9P117 Uragan Transport Standing Launcher × 3 
2T3M1 transport trailer x 4 (2SH3 container x 2)
GAZ-66 mobile command vehicle x 5 
1T12-2M weather observation vehicle x 2
8T311 fuel neutralizer transport vehicle x 3 
9G29 missile fuel vehicle x 2
ASC-4-255B oxidizer tank car x 4 
9T31M1 mobile crane x 2
Ural-4320 warhead transport truck x 2 
ZIL-131-MTO-V vehicle maintenance vehicles/ZIL-131-ITO-AT vehicle maintenance vehicle x 2
ZIL-131-9S436-1 Electronic control vehicle x 2
UAZ-469 small military car x 1
KP-130 field kitchen x 2 
ZIL-157KG transport truck x 2 
ATZ-4-131 fuel vehicle x 4

Combat use
Libya – It has been rumoured that R-17s were fired by loyalist forces against rebels in the 2011 Libyan civil war during the first phase of the war. On 14 August 2011 a confirmed R-17 launch was detected by a US Aegis destroyer, with the missile fired from Sirte and heading toward rebel positions in Ajdabiya. The missile fell 80 km off target in the middle of the desert, inflicting no damage. Eight days later, on August 22, three more R-17 launches were detected by NATO.

Specifications
 Range – 300 km,
 CEP – 500–900 m
 Type of fuel – liquid
 Preparation time – 1 hour
 Period of storage – 19 years (in stock), 6 month (in combat condition)
 Flight time – 15 minutes

See also
 Hwasong-5
 Hwasong-6

References

  
  
  
  
  
  
  
 Ракета 8К14 (Р-17) 
  
  

R-017
Chemical weapon delivery systems
Cold War missiles of the Soviet Union
Nuclear missiles of the Soviet Union
Tactical ballistic missiles
R-017
Military equipment introduced in the 1960s